South Antrim is a parliamentary constituency in the United Kingdom House of Commons. The current MP is Paul Girvan of the Democratic Unionist Party.

Boundaries

From 1885, this constituency was one of four county divisions of the former Antrim constituency. It comprised the baronies of Massereene Upper, Massereene Lower, that part of the barony Antrim Upper in the parish of Antrim, that part of the barony of Toome Upper not in the constituency of Mid Antrim, that part of the barony of Belfast Upper not in the constituency of East Antrim, and so much of the Parliamentary Borough of Belfast as was in the County of Antrim.

It returned one Member of Parliament. In 1922, it was merged into a new Antrim constituency.

The seat was re-created in 1950 when the old Antrim two MP constituency was abolished as part of the final move to single member seats. The seat was reduced in size for the 1974 general election, with the town of Carrickfergus and the areas between it and Larne town transferred to North Antrim. Additionally some territory was transferred to Belfast West. Despite these changes, the seat had become the largest in the entire United Kingdom by the time of the Northern Ireland Assembly elections of 1982, by which time its electorate had passed the 131,000 mark. For the 1983 general election Northern Ireland received new seats. Consequently, South Antrim was significantly reduced, losing a lot of territory to the new seats of East Antrim and Lagan Valley as well as minor sections to Belfast West, Belfast North and Upper Bann. The new South Antrim which was fought for the 1983 election contained only 43% of the previous seat. In 1995 there were minor changes around the borders with North Belfast and West Belfast. The seat fought at the 2005 election encompassed the entirety of the district of Antrim and part of the district of Newtownabbey.

Following consultation of boundary changes across Northern Ireland, the altered South Antrim constituency fought at the 2010 general election is made up as follows:

Glenavy from Lisburn City government area
Ballyclare North, Ballyclare South, Ballyduff, Ballynure, Ballyrobert, Burnthill, Carnmoney, Doagh, Hawthorne, Mallusk, and Mossley, from Newtownabbey
The district of Antrim

History 
South Antrim is an overwhelmingly unionist constituency which once had the strongest vote for the Ulster Unionist Party anywhere in the province.  From 1886 to 1974 the Conservative and Unionist members of the United Kingdom House of Commons formed a single Parliamentary party, and they continuously represented South Antrim

In 1951, it was one of the last four seats to be uncontested in a British General Election. In the 1979 general election James Molyneaux had the largest majority of any MP in the entire of the United Kingdom, helped also by having one of the largest electorates.

The boundary changes in 1983 reduced the Ulster Unionist vote somewhat, with a significant portion now contained in the new Lagan Valley (which Molyneaux then contested) but the constituency still gave strong results for the party.

However, in April 2000 the Ulster Unionist incumbent, Clifford Forsythe, died suddenly. The ensuing by-election took place amidst a fierce political struggle between the Ulster Unionist Party and the Democratic Unionist Party over the Good Friday Agreement, an agreement that the UUP were themselves split over. The DUP had not contested the seat at the previous general election but on this occasion stood William McCrea, the former MP for Mid Ulster, who campaigned strongly on the DUP's refusal to co-operate with Sinn Féin in the absence of arms decommissioning by the IRA. The local UUP branch selected David Burnside to contest the seat who declared that he had supported the Good Friday Agreement at the time that it was signed but had since become disillusioned with its implementation. As a result, many commentators predicted that whatever the outcome of the election it was a severe blow for the UUP's leader David Trimble. On a low turnout amidst a fierce contest McCrea narrowly won the seat.

Burnside was nominated again to contest the seat in the 2001 general election in which he overturned McCrea's majority, aided by tactical voting by SDLP and Alliance voters. However the DUP were eager to regain the seat and in the 2003 Assembly election they outpolled the UUP by 298 votes. In the 2005 general election McCrea defeated Burnside in their third contest, but with a noticeably lower swing than those garnered by other DUP candidates who ousted UUP MPs.  McCrea held the seat in the 2010 general election with a reduced majority.  The seat was won by the UUP at the 2015 general election following the defeat of McCrea by Danny Kinahan. The DUP regained the seat following the 2017 general election with the defeat of Kinahan by Paul Girvan.

Members of Parliament

Elections

Elections in the 2010s

Elections in the 2000s

Elections in the 1990s

Elections in the 1980s

Elections in the 1970s

Elections in the 1960s

Elections in the 1950s

Elections in the 1910s

Elections in the 1900s

Elections in the 1890s

Elections in the 1880s

See also 
 List of parliamentary constituencies in Northern Ireland

Notes

References

External links 
2017 Election House Of Commons Library 2017 Election report
A Vision Of Britain Through Time (Constituency elector numbers)

Politics of County Antrim
Westminster Parliamentary constituencies in Northern Ireland
Constituencies of the Parliament of the United Kingdom established in 1885
Constituencies of the Parliament of the United Kingdom disestablished in 1922
Constituencies of the Parliament of the United Kingdom established in 1950